Nipponaphera pardalis is a species of sea snail, a marine gastropod mollusk in the family Cancellariidae, the nutmeg snails.

Description
The length of the shell attains 25.4 mm.

Distribution
This marine species occurs off New Caledonia.

References

External links
 Bouchet P. & Petit R.E. (2002). New species of deep-water Cancellariidae (Gastropoda) from the southwestern Pacific. The Nautilus 116(3): 95-104

pardalis
Gastropods described in 2002